Moritz Zimmer (born 25 November 1993) is a German footballer who plays as a centre-back for FK Pirmasens.

Career
Zimmer made his professional debut for SV Elversberg in the 3. Liga on 8 February 2014, coming on as a substitute in the 90th minute for Serkan Göcer in the 2–2 home draw against Hallescher FC.

References

External links
 
 

1993 births
Living people
German footballers
Association football central defenders
3. Liga players
Regionalliga players
SV Elversberg players
SV Röchling Völklingen players
FK Pirmasens players